Give is the third studio album released by  The Bad Plus. It contains covers of Ornette Coleman's "Street Woman," The Pixies' "Velouria," and Black Sabbath's "Iron Man."

Track listing

The following appear as bonus tracks on certain editions. The recording of "Knowing Me, Knowing You" is not the same as the one that appeared on The Bad Plus album.

Personnel
Ethan Iverson – piano
Reid Anderson – double bass
David King – drums
Tchad Blake – producer

References

2004 albums
The Bad Plus albums
Albums produced by Tchad Blake